The Bedoire family is a Swedish family of French Huguenot ancestry. The Bedoire family is known for its economic activities and its ties to several prominent Stockholm families of economic influence, e.g. Toutin, Lefebure, Pauli, Campbell, Montgomery, Jennings and Finlay. One member of the Bedoire family was ennobled, Jean de Bedoire, Sweden's envoy to Portugal, while the others remained members of the bourgeoisie.

Overview 

The Bedoire family traces its origin to the historical province of Saintonge, from where the first member of the Bedoire family emigrated to Sweden, Jean Bedoire (–1721). François "Frans" Bedoire (1690–1743) and Jean Bedoire the Younger were both engaged in economic activities where they had made fortunes.

De Bedoire branch 
De Bedoire branch of the Bedoire family was created in 1777 when Sweden's envoy to Portugal, and titular governor, Jean de Bedoire was ennobled on 7 May 1777. The De Bedoire branch went extinct when he died on 30 December 1800.

Members 

 Frans Bedoire
 Jean Bedoire the Younger

References

External links 
 Genealogy of De Bedoire

Swedish families
Swedish families of French ancestry
Business families of Sweden
Huguenot families